John Sterling may refer to:

John Sterling (author) (1806–1844), British author, subject of a life by Thomas Carlyle
Major-General John Barton Sterling (1840–1926), his son and commander of the Coldstream Guards
John Sterling, character in Robert A. Heinlein's novel The Rolling Stones
John Sterling, player on 1890 Philadelphia Athletics baseball team, see 1890 Philadelphia Athletics season
John Sterling (sportscaster) (born 1938), radio announcer for the New York Yankees
John Sterling (American football) (born 1964), American football player
John Allen Sterling (1857–1918), American politician from Illinois
John Whelan Sterling (1816–1885), professor and administrator at the University of Wisconsin
John William Sterling (1844–1918), philanthropist, major benefactor to Yale University
John T. Sterling (1841–1920), Union Army soldier and Medal of Honor recipient
John E. Sterling Jr. (born 1953), U.S. Army general

See also
John Stirling (disambiguation)
H. J. Sterling (Harry John Sterling; 1882–1959), Canadian ice hockey administrator